Carder is a surname of English origin, derived from the occupation of carding. Notable people with the surname include:

 Angela Carder (1960–1987), American cancer patient, focus of a medical ethics debate over women's rights versus fetal rights
 Frederick Carder (1863–1963), English-American artist and glass maker
 Karle Carder-Andrews (born 1989), English footballer
 Kenneth Lee Carder (born 1940), American Bishop 
 Ricky "Tank" Carder (born 1989), American football player

See also
Carder (disambiguation)

References

English-language surnames
Occupational surnames
English-language occupational surnames